Julius Tröger (10 October 1862 – 29 July 1942) was a German chemist.

Tröger studied at the University of Leipzig from 1882 till 1888.
During his Ph.D. he synthesized in 1887 2,8-dimethyl-6H,12H-5,11-methanodibenzo-[b,f][1,5]diazocine from p-toluidine and formaldehyde.  This substance is now known as the Tröger's base.
Because he was not able to give a structure of the new compound  Johannes Wislicenus, the new director of the department, assigned a mediocre grade for Trögers thesis.
It took another 48 years to confirm the structure of Tröger's base.
In 1888 he started working at the Braunschweig University of Technology where he stayed until his retirement in 1928.  Tröger died in Brunswick.

References 

 

1862 births
1942 deaths
20th-century German chemists
Scientists from Leipzig
Leipzig University alumni
Academic staff of the Technical University of Braunschweig
19th-century German chemists